Barnaby Records was an American record company founded by singer Andy Williams in 1963 with his purchase of soon-to-be-liquidated Cadence Records. It held the rights to work by a number of popular music performers including Williams work before he was with Columbia Records.

Williams got control of the Cadence master tapes in the 1960s but limited releases to that of himself and another former Cadence artist, Lenny Welch. This material was released on Williams's label at the time, Columbia Records.

In 1970, Williams created the Barnaby label (named after his beloved dog Mr. Barnaby) to release the rest of the long unreleased Cadence archive, principally that of the Everly Brothers, which had been long out of print but in continued great demand. Barnaby also released new material by artists such as Ray Stevens, who scored Top Ten hits with his singles "Everything Is Beautiful" and "The Streak", some early LPs by Jimmy Buffett as well as a few LPs by Claudine Longet, who was Williams's wife at the time.

Barnaby had several distributors including CBS, then MGM, and finally GRT in 1974. Once Barnaby ceased operating as a working record company at the end of the 1970s, Williams licensed the old Cadence and Barnaby material to various other labels such as Varèse Sarabande and Rhino, and Time-Life after 1980, and he also leased some of the same material to Hip-O beginning in 1996.

Performers
Performers signed to Barnaby include:
Paul Anka
Ken Berry
Jimmy Buffett
The Chordettes
The Crickets
The Everly Brothers
The Hager Twins
Doyle Holly
Claudine Longet
Charles Mingus
The Osmond Brothers
Don Shirley
Ray Stevens
Cecil Taylor
The Toshiko - Mariano Quartet
Lenny Welch
Link Wray

See also
List of record labels

External links
 The Barnaby Label Album Discography

American record labels
Record labels established in 1964
Pop record labels